Senet was an Ancient Egyptian king's wife and king's mother, known from three statues, that date to the Middle Kingdom, perhaps to the 12th Dynasty. Her husband and royal son are not known for sure. The statues show the queen sitting on a throne. For two of the statues the upper part is missing. A third statue preserves the upper part but the face is heavily damaged. Gae Callender proposed king Amenemhat II as her husband, as his wife is not yet identified for sure, while for most other 12th Dynasty kings a wife is known.

References

External links 
Senet on Persons and Names of the Middle Kingdom

Queens consort of the Twelfth Dynasty of Egypt
19th-century BC women
18th-century BC women
Senusret III